The C. Brewer Building at 827 Fort Street in Honolulu, Hawaii was built in 1930 to be the headquarters of C. Brewer & Co., the smallest of Hawaii's Big Five corporations. The intimate, almost residential design was begun by Bertram Goodhue and completed by Hardie Phillip. The building was added to the National Register of Historic Places on 2 April 1980.

Built of reinforced concrete in a Mediterranean Revival style, with cut sandstone and stucco and plaster finish, a walled garden, and second-floor balconies, it also features a tiled, double-pitched "Dickey roof" with wide eaves to protect against sun and rain. The modest decorations symbolized the business of the C. Brewer Company: wrought iron railings represent sugar cane, and light fixtures were designed to resemble of sugar cubes.

After closing down the sugar business and diversifying into other agricultural products and spinning off its real-estate business, the company moved to Hilo, Hawaii on the Big Island of Hawaii in 1998.
The building now houses the statewide headquarters of the Hawaii Community Foundation which moved into the building in 2010.

Gallery

References

External links

 

Mediterranean Revival architecture in Hawaii
Commercial buildings on the National Register of Historic Places in Hawaii
Office buildings in Hawaii
Buildings and structures in Honolulu
Commercial buildings in Hawaii
Bertram Goodhue buildings
Historic American Buildings Survey in Hawaii
National Register of Historic Places in Honolulu
1930 establishments in Hawaii
Commercial buildings completed in 1930